Vårvik is a Norwegian surname. Notable people with the surname include:

 Atle Vårvik (born 1965), Norwegian speed skater and entrepreneur
 Dagfinn Vårvik (1924–2018), Norwegian politician
 Kåre Vårvik, Norwegian cyclist

Norwegian-language surnames